Richard Flower may refer to:

 Richard Flower (martyr), English martyr
 Richard Flower (settler) (1760–1829), English banker, brewer and pioneer of Albion, Illinois